Rio Blanco is a stream that is tributary of the San Juan River in southern Colorado, United States. The stream originates in the San Juan Mountains and flows for  through the San Juan National Forest and private lands to its confluence with the San Juan River in Archuleta County, Colorado. Colorado classifies the Rio Blanco as an Aquatic Life Coldwater Class 1/Recreation Class 1 waterway supporting water supply and agricultural uses. The river also features native cutthroat trout and introduced rainbow trout fishing.

Restoration project

The San Juan–Chama Diversion Project, which was started in 1971, diverted water from the river at the Blanco Diversion Dam and eventually led to reduced water flow and a loss of aquatic habitat in the Rio Blanco. In 1998, Colorado included a 12-mile reach of the lower Rio Blanco on its list of impaired waters for failure to support its aquatic life due to sediment. A grass roots project organized by the residents aided by numerous local statewide and federal agencies to restore the stream channel to match the altered flow regime, resulted in the river's physical and biological function and water quality being improved. In 2008, Colorado removed the Rio Blanco, including the 12-miles of the lower reach, from the state's list of impaired waters.

Fishing

Most of the trout are in the  range.

Rosgen's plan included placing boulders and old trees on the river banks to direct the waters toward a channel that would be more defined. He also constructed a tube to divert away the gravel and sand, which allows water to flow through, but the sediment is routed to a holding area which is regularly emptied and used elsewhere. Cost of the renovation was about $1 million. The three-mile stretch may be fished by guests of El Rancho Pinoso, a privately owned ranch near the river.

See also
 List of rivers of Colorado
 Stream restoration
 Restoration ecology

References

Blanco
Blanco
Blanco
Fish of North America
Colorado River Storage Project
Aquatic ecology